Dopeman Music is the first mixtape by southern rapper Scarface. It was released on his independent label Facemob Music. The song "Dopeman Music" had a promotional video. 2 years after Scarface announced his retirement he came back to hip hop with this mixtape; speaking on the issue Scarface said, "I'm a free agent".

Track listing

Personnel
 Bido 1 - Engineer, Production Coordination
 Oscar White - Mastering, Mixing

Charts

References

Scarface (rapper) albums
2010 compilation albums